Oxylaemus is a genus of beetles in the family Teredidae. There are at least three described species in Oxylaemus.

Species
These three species belong to the genus Oxylaemus:
 Oxylaemus americanus LeConte, 1863
 Oxylaemus californicus Crotch, 1874
 Oxylaemus variolosus (Dufour, 1843)

References

Further reading

External links

 

Coccinelloidea genera
Articles created by Qbugbot